Johnny Griffin Vol. 2 (also known as A Blowin' Session) is an album by jazz saxophonist Johnny Griffin, recorded in April 1957 and released in September or October of the same year on the Blue Note label. It was reissued in 1999, featuring an alternate take of "Smoke Stack."

Track listing 
"The Way You Look Tonight (Kern, Fields) - 9:41
"Ball Bearing" (Griffin) - 8:11
"All the Things You Are" (Kern, Hammerstein) - 10:14
"Smoke Stack" (Griffin) - 10:13
"Smoke Stack" [Alternate Take] - 11:00 Bonus track on CD

Personnel 
 Johnny Griffin — tenor saxophone
 John Coltrane — tenor saxophone
 Hank Mobley — tenor saxophone
 Lee Morgan — trumpet
 Wynton Kelly — piano
 Paul Chambers — bass
 Art Blakey — drums

References 

1957 albums
Johnny Griffin albums
Blue Note Records albums
Albums produced by Alfred Lion